Mount Denucé is a rounded mountain,  high, between Mount Hulth and Mount Haskell on the southwest side of Cabinet Inlet, on the east coast of Graham Land. It was charted by the Falkland Islands Dependencies Survey (FIDS) and photographed from the air by the Ronne Antarctic Research Expedition in December 1947. It was named by the FIDS for Jean Denucé, a Belgian polar bibliographer.

References

Mountains of Graham Land
Foyn Coast